84882 Table Mountain, provisional designation , is a bright background asteroid from the central region of the asteroid belt, approximately  in diameter. It was discovered on 1 February 2003, by American astronomer James Whitney Young at the Table Mountain Observatory near Wrightwood, California. The S/Q-type asteroid was later named after the discovering observatory.

Orbit and classification 

Table Mountain is a non-family from the main belt's background population. It orbits the Sun in the central asteroid belt at a distance of 1.9–3.4 AU once every 4 years and 3 months (1,562 days; semi-major axis of 2.64 AU). Its orbit has an eccentricity of 0.29 and an inclination of 14° with respect to the ecliptic.

Naming 

This minor planet was named for the Table Mountain Observatory, the discoverer's workplace, currently a NASA facility operated by the California Institute of Technology's Jet Propulsion Laboratory, which began operation as a Smithsonian Institution site in 1924 to study the solar constant. In the late 1950s, the site was used to test the first solar panels and is now dedicated to optical astronomy and to study Earth's atmosphere. The official  was published by the Minor Planet Center on 28 October 2004.

Physical characteristics 

In the SDSS-based taxonomy, Table Mountain has been characterized as both S-type and Q-type asteroid.

Diameter and albedo 

According to the survey carried out by the NEOWISE mission of NASA's Wide-field Infrared Survey Explorer, Table Mountain measures 3.0 kilometers in diameter and its surface has a high albedo between 0.28 and 0.31. As of 2018, no rotational lightcurve of Table Mountain has been obtained from photometric observations. The body's rotation period, pole and shape remain unknown.

References

External links 
 Dictionary of Minor Planet Names, Google books
 Discovery Circumstances: Numbered Minor Planets (80001)-(85000) – Minor Planet Center
 
 

084882
Discoveries by James Whitney Young
Named minor planets
20030201